The Ringerike Panthers are an ice hockey team in Hønefoss, Norway. They currently play in the Fjordkraft Ligaen, the highest level of Norwegian ice hockey. The teams plays its home games in the Schjongshallen.

History
The club was founded on December 14, 1974. They took on the name Panthers in 2001.

External links
Official website 

Ice hockey teams in Norway
Ice hockey clubs established in 1974
1974 establishments in Norway
GET-ligaen teams
Sport in Buskerud
Ringerike (municipality)